This is a list of countries (sovereign states) and territories without an airport.

Sovereign states
Of the world's independent states, only five of the six European microstates have no airport within their boundaries, though all have at least one heliport. All apart from Monaco are landlocked. (Liechtenstein is doubly landlocked.)

States with limited recognition

Non-self-governing territories

Of the world's 17 non-self-governing territories, two have no airport within their boundaries: Tokelau and the Pitcairn Islands. Both are remote island groups, so a fairly long boat trip is the only way to get there.

Notes

References

C
Airport, without